The Red Flag Group was a global integrity and compliance risk firm based in Hong Kong with 15 offices located throughout the United States, Asia, Middle East and Europe. The firm had approximately 300 employees, who advised clients across a range of industries on compliance and anti-corruption regulation. It also had a partnership with LexisNexis in the area of outsourced due diligence.

They applied a unique set of business intelligence, advice, and technology to manage the integrity and compliance risks across four key areas:

 Planning, implementing, measuring and monitoring integrity and compliance programmes 
 Selecting and managing the integrity of suppliers 
 Selecting and ensuring compliance in sales channel compliance 
 Making sure you know your customers so your integrity in protected 

On 5 October 2020, The Red Flag Group was acquired by Refinitiv.

Area
 Antitrust and corruption
 Employment, safety and reputation
 Cyber security and business stability
 Environment and governance

References

External links
 Official Homepage
 Insights

Chinese companies established in 2006
2006 establishments in Hong Kong
Business services companies established in 2006
Financial services companies of China